Mooi may refer to:

People
 Bertus Mooi Wilten (1913–1965), Dutch swimmer
 C. J. de Mooi (born 1969), British celebrity
 Mooi Choo Chuah, Chinese engineer

Places
 Mooi River (town), South Africa
 Mooi River (Tugela), South Africa
 Mooi River (Vaal), South Africa

Other
 Mooi, song by Marco Borsato